Matilde Estefanía Alcázar Figueroa is a Mexican Paralympic swimmer who competes in international swimming competitions. She is a triple Parapan American Games champion and a World champion, she has also competed at the 2012 and 2020 Summer Paralympics.

In 2018, Alcázar broke the world record in the women's 100m backstroke S11 which had been held for 34 years. She broke the record at a World Para Swimming World Series in Sao Paulo.

References

Living people
Year of birth missing (living people)
Date of birth missing (living people)
Swimmers from Mexico City
Paralympic swimmers of Mexico
Swimmers at the 2012 Summer Paralympics
Swimmers at the 2020 Summer Paralympics
Medalists at the 2019 Parapan American Games
Medalists at the World Para Swimming Championships
S11-classified Paralympic swimmers